Sällskapsresan 2 – Snowroller is a Swedish comedy film which was released to cinemas in Sweden on 4 October 1985, directed by Lasse Åberg and Peter Hald.

Synopsis 
The film is about the Swede Stig-Helmer and his Norwegian friend Ole going to the alps, where a lot of crazy things happens during a ski-vacation.

Cast
Lasse Åberg - Stig Helmer Olsson
Jon Skolmen - Ole Bramserud
Björn Granath -  Mr. Jönsson
Staffan Ling - Hedlund
Cecilia Walton - Lotta
Eva Millberg - Kärran
Ingrid Wallin - Mrs Jönsson
Klasse Möllberg - Mackan
Bengt Andersson - Brännström
Jan Waldekranz - Nalle
Oscar Franzén - Niklas Jönsson
Erica Larsson - Sara Jönsson
Felix S:t Clair - Felix
Dieter Augustin - Dr. Katz
David Kehoe - Algernon Wickham-Twistleton-Ffykes ("Algy")
Barbro Hiort af Ornäs - Stig-Helmer's mother

References

External links 

Swedish sequel films
1980s Swedish-language films
1985 films
1985 comedy films
Films set in Switzerland
Films set in the Alps
Swedish comedy films
Skiing films
Films directed by Lasse Åberg
1980s Swedish films